The 17th National Congress of the Kuomintang was the seventeenth national congress of the Kuomintang, held on 19–20 August 2005 at Sun Yat-sen Memorial Hall in Taipei, Taiwan.

See also
 Kuomintang

References

2005 conferences
2005 in Taiwan
National Congresses of the Kuomintang
Politics of Taiwan